This was the first edition of the tournament.

Santiago Rodríguez Taverna won the title after defeating Facundo Díaz Acosta 6–4, 6–2 in the final.

Seeds

Draw

Finals

Top half

Bottom half

References

External links
Main draw
Qualifying draw

Challenger de Tigre - 1